Dunfermline Abbey is a Church of Scotland parish church in Dunfermline, Fife, Scotland. The church occupies the site of the ancient chancel and transepts of a large medieval Benedictine abbey, which was sacked in 1560 during the Scottish Reformation and permitted to fall into disrepair. Part of the old abbey church continued in use at that time and some parts of the abbey infrastructure still remain.

History

Early history

The Benedictine Abbey of the Holy Trinity and St Margaret, was founded in 1128 by King David I of Scotland, but the monastic establishment was based on an earlier priory dating back to the reign of his father King Máel Coluim mac Donnchada, i. e. "Malcolm III" or "Malcolm Canmore" (regnat 1058–93), and his queen, St Margaret.

At its head  was the Abbot of Dunfermline, the first of which was Geoffrey of Canterbury, former Prior of Christ Church, Canterbury, the Kent monastery that probably supplied Dunfermline's first monks. At the peak of its power it controlled four burghs, three courts of regality, and a large portfolio of lands from Moray in the north south to Berwickshire.

In the decades after its foundation the abbey was the recipient of considerable endowments, as seen from the dedication of 26 altars donated by individual benefactors and guilds and it was an important destination of pilgrims because it hosted the reliquary shrine and cult of Saint Margaret, from whom the abbey later claimed foundation and for which an earlier foundation charter was fabricated.
The foundations of the earliest church, namely the Church of the Holy Trinity, are under the superb Romanesque nave built in the 12th century.

During the winter of 1303 the court of Edward I of England was held in the abbey, and on his departure the following year most of the buildings were burned.

Later history

During the Scottish Reformation, the abbey church had undergone a first Protestant ‘cleansing’ by September 1559, and was sacked in March 1560. By September 1563 the choir and feretory chapel were roofless, and it was said that the nave was also in a sorry state, with the walls so extensively damaged that it was a danger to enter. Some parts of the abbey infrastructure still remain, principally the vast refectory and rooms over the gatehouse which was part of the former city wall. The nave was also spared and it was repaired in 1570 by Robert Drummond of Carnock. In 1672 parts of the east end collapsed, while in 1716 part of the central tower is said to have fallen, presumably destabilising much that still stood around its base, and the east gable tumbled in 1726. The final collapse of the central tower took place in 1753.

The nave served as the parish church till the 19th century, and now forms the vestibule of a new church. This edifice, in the Perpendicular style, opened for public worship in 1821, occupies the site of the ancient chancel and transepts, though differing in style and proportions from the original structure. Also of the monastery there still remains the south wall of the refectory, with a fine window. Next to the abbey is the ruin of Dunfermline Palace, also part of the original abbey complex and connected to it via the gatehouse.

Dunfermline Abbey, one of Scotland's most important cultural sites, has received more of Scotland's royal dead than any other place in the kingdom, excepting Iona. One of the most notable non-royal names to be associated with the abbey is the northern renaissance poet, Robert Henryson. The tomb of Saint Margaret and Malcolm Canmore, within the ruined walls of the Lady chapel, was restored and enclosed by command of Queen Victoria.

Today

The current building on the site of the choir of the old abbey church is a parish church of the Church of Scotland, still with the name Dunfermline Abbey. The minister is the Reverend MaryAnn R. Rennie.

Architecture

The old building was a fine example of simple and massive Romanesque, as the nave testifies, and has a beautiful doorway in its west front. Alexander I had the two towers built which flanked the great western entrance.

Another rich Romanesque doorway was exposed in the south wall in 1903, when masons were cutting a site for the memorial to the soldiers who had fallen in the Second Boer War. A new site was found for this monument in order that the ancient and beautiful entrance might be preserved. The venerable structure is maintained publicly, and private munificence has provided several stained-glass windows. The architecture of the Afghan Church in Mumbai in India (dedicated to St John the Baptist) references the door and the right side of the church of Dunfermline Abbey.

Notable ceremonies and burials
 Saint Margaret of Scotland was buried here in 1093; on 19 June 1250 following her canonization her remains were disinterred and placed in a reliquary at the high altar. Her husband Malcolm III's remains were also disinterred, and buried next to Margaret.
 Duncan II of Scotland 1094
Edgar of Scotland was buried here in 1107
 Both Alexander I of Scotland 1124, and his queen Sybilla de Normandy 1122, were buried here
 David I of Scotland was buried here (1153) along with his queen Maud, Countess of Huntingdon (1130)
 Malcolm IV of Scotland was buried here in 1165
Gille Brigte, Earl of Angus (buried here)
Adam, Earl of Angus (buried here)
Gille Críst, Earl of Angus (buried here)
Donnchadh, Earl of Angus (buried here)
 Alexander III of Scotland (1286), was buried here, with his first wife Margaret of England (1275) and their sons David of Scotland (1281) and Alexander of Scotland (1284)
 Elizabeth de Burgh, wife of Robert I of Scotland, was buried here in 1327

Robert the Bruce was buried, in 1329, in the choir, now the site of the present parish church. Bruce's heart rests in Melrose, but his bones lie in Dunfermline Abbey, where (after the discovery of the skeleton in 1818) they were reinterred with fitting pomp below the pulpit of the New church. In 1891, the pulpit was moved back and a monumental brass inserted in the floor to indicate the royal vault.
 Matilda of Scotland, daughter of Robert I of Scotland, was buried here in 1353
 Anabella Drummond, wife of Robert III and mother of James I was buried here in 1401
 Robert Stewart, Duke of Albany was buried here in 1420
Bishop James Bruce, buried in 1447
 George Durie (d,1577) memorial in north aisle
 Robert Pitcairn (commendator) (d.1584) memorial in north aisle
 Birthplace, in 1600, of Charles I, the last British monarch born in Scotland.
 William Schaw, Master of Work to the Crown of Scotland, was buried here in 1602: his tomb can still be seen.
David Lindsay, 1st Lord Balcarres, son of John Lindsay of Balcarres, Lord Menmuir and father of Alexander Lindsay, 1st Earl of Balcarres, was married here in 1611

Other burials
Charles Bruce, 5th Earl of Elgin
Margaret Wake, 3rd Baroness Wake of Liddell

See also
 Abbot of Dunfermline
 Abbeys and priories in Scotland
 List of Church of Scotland parishes
 List of places in Fife
 Robert Henryson

References

Sources

External links

 Dunfermline Abbey (Church of Scotland congregation)
 Engraving of Dunfermline Abbey by James Fittler in the digitised copy of Scotia Depicta, or the antiquities, castles, public buildings, noblemen and gentlemen's seats, cities, towns and picturesque scenery of Scotland, 1804 at National Library of Scotland
 Engraving of Dunfermline Abbey in 1693 by John Slezer at National Library of Scotland

Religious buildings and structures completed in 1150
Listed monasteries in Scotland
Listed churches in Scotland
Benedictine monasteries in Scotland
Christian monasteries established in the 12th century
Religious organizations established in the 1120s
1128 establishments in Scotland
Protestant churches converted from Roman Catholicism
Romanesque architecture in Scotland
Church of Scotland churches in Scotland
Scheduled Ancient Monuments in Fife
Historic Environment Scotland properties
Museums in Fife
Religious museums in Scotland
Category A listed buildings in Fife
Ruined abbeys and monasteries
Ruins in Fife
Burial sites of the House of Bruce
Former Christian monasteries in Scotland
Buildings and structures in Dunfermline